Nocturne is a 1946 American film noir starring George Raft and Lynn Bari.  The film was produced by longtime Alfred Hitchcock associate Joan Harrison, scripted by Jonathan Latimer, and directed by Edwin L. Marin. It was one of several medium budget thrillers Raft made in the late 1940s.

Plot
The film opens on Keith Vincent, a Hollywood composer, as he creates a new song called "Nocturne". As he plays his piano, a woman sits silently in the shadows and listens to the composer speak as he plays. But the mood changes a little when he says, "You're no longer the one," and encourages her to go away for a while. Moments later, as he alters the score with a pen, the composer is shot and killed.

The police think it is suicide, but detective Joe Warne suspects murder. He encounters Vincent's housekeeper, Susan Flanders, who had been sleeping in the house but had been wearing ear-plugs because "she didn't like the music". They take her in for questioning.

Warne begins looking for "Dolores", because he sees that the score for "Nocturne" still on the piano has a hand-written dedication to this name. The Filipino houseboy, Eujemio, arrives after a day off - he knows his employer was planning to meet a woman but he does not know who. He tells Warne that the composer was a womanizer who called all of his girlfriends Dolores. There is a line of female photos on the wall... one is missing.

The coroner returns a verdict of suicide but Warne continues to investigate despite being warned to stop by his boss. Warne follows a series of clues around Los Angeles. He spots that he is being followed by a large man and challenges him outside the Brown Derby.

Warne's ruthless questioning tactics lead several suspects to report him for abuse. Pursuing the case with dogged determination, the obsessed Warne is suspended from the police force. As he digs deeper into the murder, the clues draw him closer to Frances Ransom, but he deduces that she was framed by Ned Ford.

Ford was enraged that his wife Carol had merely been the composer's latest conquest. When he found out that the composer had no intention of marrying Carol, Ford decided to kill him. Warne turns Ford over to the police, and reveals to Frances that he knew almost from the beginning that she was not the murderer.

Cast
 George Raft as Joe Warne
 Lynn Bari as Frances Ransom
 Virginia Huston as Carol Page
 Joseph Pevney as Ned "Fingers" Ford
 Myrna Dell as Susan Flanders
 Edward Ashley as Keith Vincent
 Walter Sande as Police Lt. Halberson
 Mabel Paige as Mrs. Warne
 Bern Hoffman as Erik Torp
 Queenie Smith as Queenie, Nora's Roommate
 Virginia Keiley as Lotus Evans, Model
 Mack Gray as Gratz
 Lilian Bond (1946) as Mrs. Billings
 Rudy Robles as Eujemio
 Greta Granstedt as Clara
 Carol Forman as Receptionist
 William Challee as Police Photographer

Production
George Raft and Edward Marin had just made Johnny Angel together from RKO which proved popular. Raft's and Marin's involvement in Nocturne was announced in September 1945. (In between Johnny Angel and Nocturne, Raft and Marin made Mr. Ace for Benedict Bogeaus.)

Joan Harrison was signed by RKO to produce the film in October.

Joseph Pevney was brought out from Broadway to play a supporting role. Jane Greer was up for the female lead but George Raft went for the better-known Lynn Bari. Bari was borrowed from 20th Century Fox. Filming started in May 1946.

Raft reportedly did some rewriting of the script to make his character more sympathetic.

Reception

Box office
The film was popular on release and recorded a profit of $568,000.

Critical reception
When the film was released, the staff at Variety magazine wrote, "Nocturne is a detective thriller with action and suspense plentiful and hard-bitten mood of story sustained by Edwin L. Marin's direction." "Moments of suspense and excitement... are rare", wrote the New York Times. The Los Angeles Times called it "a skillfully worked out murder melodrama."

References

External links
 
 
 
 
Review of film at Variety
 

1946 films
American mystery films
1940s English-language films
American black-and-white films
Film noir
American police detective films
Films directed by Edwin L. Marin
Films scored by Leigh Harline
1946 mystery films
1940s American films